Seth Landqvist (8 August 1882 – 2 April 1945) was a Swedish long-distance runner. He competed in the men's marathon at the 1908 Summer Olympics, but failed to finish. He also competed in the men's five miles, finishing ninth.

Landqvist competed for the athletics clubs Fredrikshofs IF and Östermalms IF. He was also a member of the Swedish Olympic team for the 3-mile event at the 1908 Olympics, but did not compete.

References

External links
 

1882 births
1945 deaths
Athletes (track and field) at the 1908 Summer Olympics
Swedish male long-distance runners
Swedish male marathon runners
Olympic athletes of Sweden
Athletes from Stockholm